Joy K. Ward is a leading evolutionary biologist studying the impact of the environment on plants and ecosystems. She began a new role as the dean of the College of Arts & Sciences at Case Western Reserve University on July 1, 2020 - leaving behind her professorship at the University of Kansas. Her research on plant life has gained her notoriety in many scientific research fields. Aside from her work in the lab, she is also a strong advocate for advancing underrepresented communities' scientific learning and careers. As part of her deanship at the University of Kansas, Ward was an important factor in increasing the number of underrepresented individuals who held faculty positions in STEM subjects. Notably, as a result of her research efforts, she was awarded the Presidential Early Career Award for Scientists and Engineers by U.S. President Barack Obama.

Education 
Ward holds three degrees - a bachelor's, master's, and PhD. She received her bachelor's degree in biology from Penn State University in 1991. Moving to Durham, she completed her master's degree in botany in 1994 at Duke. This was quickly followed by a PhD, also from Duke, in botany that was completed in 1997. Since 1997, Ward has also published over 40 peer-reviewed articles.

Research interests 
Ward's primary research interests focus on how plants adapt to changing environments and conditions. As global warming has become a prevalent issue for all, Ward has directed her research to understanding how specific species of plants react to changes in the atmospheric concentration of carbon dioxide. Utilizing a holistic approach to her research, Ward is interested in understanding these changes on multiple levels - molecularly, physiologically, and evolutionary. Ward is better able to understand the long-term impacts of atmospheric changes by utilizing fossil records in her research. Understanding how plants have adapted to environmental shifts in the past is an integral part of Ward's research. With her arsenal of knowledge, Ward hopes to be able to contribute ideas and strategies for conserving and ensuring the health of earth's currently thriving ecosystems.

Carbon dioxide impacts 
As carbon dioxide levels continuously fluctuate, Ward has studied the impact this has on plants. By forming an understanding of how plants adapt, Ward hopes we might be better able to predict how they will behave in the future. This will have monumental impacts on various ecosystems throughout the world. As aforementioned, Ward has been a pioneer in utilizing fossil records in her research. Through chemical and physical analysis, this groundbreaking work enabled Ward to understand past adaptations of plant life.

in 1999, Ward examined the differences in response between C3 and C4 plants when exposed to drought in environments that were low in carbon dioxide or high in carbon dioxide. Ward and her team found evidence that C4 plants have an advantage over C3 plants when atmospheric carbon dioxide levels increase. Additionally, the team found evidence that C4 plants have an advantage over C3 plants when they experience frequent and severe droughts. During this time, Ward also led research studies on the ways that increasing atmospheric carbon dioxide has affected plant species in the past and present. Ward has used her data to predict how plants and future ecosystems and biological processes will operate in the future where atmospheric carbon dioxide levels will become higher.

Carbon Dioxide Implications for the Future
Many of Ward's more recent research involves her predictions about the way that increasing atmospheric carbon dioxide will impact plants, ecosystems, and ecology. In 2017, Ward led a study about plant responses to increasing carbon dioxide in the past, present, and future. Ward maintains that studying plants in this manner will allow scientists to better understand and predict the evolutionary consequences that will come with the changing environment. In this study, Ward found evidence for the implications of rising carbon dioxide for integrated plant-water dynamics and drought tolerance, the carbon dioxide effects on symbiotic interactions and evolutionary feedbacks, and the change in plant mechanisms in response to elevated carbon dioxide levels.

Teaching career 
2020—present: Dean, College of Arts and Sciences, Case Western Reserve University
2015—2020: Dean's professor of the College of Liberal Arts and Sciences, University of Kansas
2015—2020: Professor with tenure, University of Kansas, Department of Ecology & Evolutionary Biology (courtesy appointment in environmental studies)
2009—2015: Associate professor with tenure, University of Kansas, Department of Ecology & Evolutionary Biology (courtesy appointment in environmental studies)
2006—2016: Inaugural Thelma and Edward Wohlgemuth Faculty Scholar Award. Endowed chair for early-career faculty, University of Kansas
2003—2009: Assistant professor, University of Kansas, Department of Ecology &  Evolutionary Biology
1998—2003: Postdoctoral fellow, University of Utah, Department of Biology
1997—1998: Postdoctoral fellow, University of West Virginia and Duke University,  Department(s) of Biology  

*All positions have been uploaded from Ward's curriculum vitae

Awards and honors 
2020: Dean of the College of Arts and Sciences at Case Western Reserve University
2018: Graduate of the Food Systems Leadership Institute 
2017: Elected to lead Scientific Research at the University of Kansas' College of Libral Arts and Sciences
2016—2017: Women of Distinction Award, University of Kansas
2015: K. Barbara Schowen Undergraduate Research Mentor Award, University of Kansas
2015: Dean's Professor at the University of Kansas
2012—2013: Member of a U.S. delegation to Uzbekistan following a technology  agreement through Hillary Clinton; sponsored by the American Association for the Advancement of Science (AAAS) and the U.S. State Department, Tashkent, Uzbekistan
2011—present: National Academy of Sciences, Frontiers of Science, U.S. chair "These symposia have become a major instrument in bringing together the best young researchers- the next generation of  leaders- in the natural sciences and engineering fields, in the U.S. and around the world." National Academy of Sciences
Arab-American Frontiers of Science
Participant in 2011 Symposium (Kuwait)
Planning Member for the 2014 Symposium (Oman)
U.S. Chair for the 2015 Symposium (Saudi Arabia)
Japanese-American Frontiers of Science
Participant in 2010 Symposium (Japan)
Planning Member for the 2014 Symposium (U.S.)
U.S. Chair for the 2014 Symposium (Japan)
2011: Named as a top scientist in Kansas history by the Ad Astra Initiative
2010: Member of the Board of Trustees for the University of Kansas Office of Research
2010—present: Kavli Fellow: Selected by the Kavli Board and the National Academy  of Sciences
2009: Presidential Early Career Award for Scientists and Engineers (PECASE); Conferred personally by President Obama on January 13, 2010, in the White House "This is the highest honor bestowed by the United States government  on outstanding scientists and engineers in the early stages of their independent research careers" White House press release
2009: Lawrence, KS Chamber of Commerce, KU Stars Award 2008—2015: National Science Foundation CAREER Award
2006—2015: Thelma and Edward Wohlgemuth Faculty Scholar Award
1998—1999: American Association of University Women (AAUW). American Post doctoral Fellowship
1997: Perry Prize for the Dissertation of Greatest Distinction. Duke  University, Department of Botany
1997: Sigma Xi Travel Award, Duke University
1991:: Hammond Science Scholarship, Penn State University
1991: Amos William and Annie Martha Unger Memorial Scholarship, Penn State University
1988: Pennsylvania State Fair Queen scholarship- University tuition scholarship

*All awards and honors  have been uploaded from Ward's curriculum vitae

Select publications

 McLean BS, JK Ward, MJ Polito, SD Emslie. In press. Responses of alpine herbaceous plant assemblages to low glacial [CO2] revealed by fossil marmot Marmota) teeth. Oecologia
 Fuller BT, SM Fahrni, JM Harris, A Farrell, JB Coltrain, LM Gerhart, JK Ward, RE Taylor, JR Southon. In press. Ultrafiltration for asphalt removal from bone collagen for radiocarbon dating and isotopic analysis of Pleistocene fauna at the tar pits of Rancho La Brea. Quaternary Geochronology
 Voelker, S.L., R. Brooks, F.C. Meinzer, R. Andeson, M. K-F Bader, G. Battipaglia, K.M. Becklin, D. Beerling, D. Bert, J.L. Beltancourt, T.E. Dawson, J. -C Domec, R.P. Guyette, C. Koerner, S.W. Leavitt, S. Linder, J.D. Marshall, M. Mildner, I. Panyushkina, H.J. Plumpton, K.S. Pregitzer, M. Saurer, A.R Smith, R.T.W. Siegwolf, M.C. Stambaugh, A.F. Talhelm, J.C. Tardif, P.K. Van de Water, J.K. Ward, and L. Wingate. 2015. A dynamic leaf gas-exchange strategy is conserved in woody plats under changing [CO2] enrichment studies.  Global Change Biology 22(2): 889–902.
 Becklin KM, JS Medeiros, K Sale, *JK Ward. 2014. Evolutionary history underlies plant physiological responses to global change since the Last Glacial Maximum. Ecology Letters: 17: 691-699
 Basheer-salimia R, JK Ward. 2014. Climate change and its effects on olive tree physiology in Palestine. Review Of Research: 3: 1-7
 Medeiros JS, JK Ward. 2013. Increasing atmospheric [CO2] from glacial to future concentrations affects drought tolerance via impacts on leaves, xylem and their integrated function. New Phytologist: 199: 738–748.
 Ward, J. K., D. S. Roy, I. Chatterjee, C. R. Bone, C. J. Springer, and J. K. Kelly. 2012. "Identification of a major QTL that alters flowering time at elevated [CO2] in Arabidopsis thaliana" PLoS ONE. 7. e49028.
 Gerhart, L. M., J. M. Harris, J. B. Nippert, D. R. Sandquist, and J. K. Ward. 2012. "Glacial trees from the La Brea tar pits show physiological constraints of low CO2" New Phytologist. 194. 63–69.
 Gerhart, L. M. and J. K. Ward. 2010. "Plant Responses to low [CO2] of the past. Tansley Review" New Phytologist. 188. 674–695.
 Nippert, J. B., J. J. Butler, G. J. Kluitenberg, D. O. Whittemore, D. Arnold, S. E. Spal, and J. K. Ward. 2010. "Patterns of Tamarix water use during a record drought" Oecologia. 162. 283–292.
 Nippert, J. B., M. B. Hooten, D. R. Sandquist, and J. K. Ward. 2010. "A Bayesian model for predicting El Niño events using tree-ring widths and cellulose δ18O" Journal of Geophysical Research: Biogeosciences. 115. G01011.
 Gonzalez-Meler, M. A., E. Blanc-Betes, C. E. Flower, J. K. Ward, and N. Gomez-Casanovas. 2009. "Plastic and adaptive responses of plant respiration to changes in atmospheric CO2 concentration" Physiologia Plantarum. 137. 473–484.
 Ward, J. K., D. A. Myers, and R. B. Thomas. 2008. "Physiological and growth responses of C3 and C4 plants to reduced temperature when grown at low CO2 of the last ice age" Journal of Integrative Plant Biology. 50. 1388–1395.
 Marchin RM, EL Sage, JK Ward. 2008. Population-level variation of Fraxinus americana L. (white ash) is influenced by precipitation differences across the native range. Tree Physiology 28: 151-159
 Springer CJ, JK Ward. 2007. Flowering time and elevated CO2. Tansley Review. New Phytologist 176: 243-255 
 Ward, J. K.. 2005. "Evolution and growth of plants in a low CO2 world" A History of Atmospheric CO2 and Its Effects on Plants, Animals, and Ecosystems. edited by Ehleringer, J. R., T. E. Cerling, and D. Dearing. 232–257.
 Ward, J. K., J. M. Harris, T. E. Cerling, A. Wiedenhoeft, M. J. Lott, M. Dearing, J. B. Coltrain, and J. R. Ehleringer. 2005. "Carbon starvation in glacial trees recovered from the La Brea tar pits" Proceedings of the National Academy of Sciences of the United States of America. 102. 690–694.
 Ward, J. K. and J. K. Kelly. 2004. "Scaling up evolutionary responses to elevated CO2: lessons from Arabidopsis" Ecology Letters. 7. 427–440.

References

External links 
Curriculum vitae

Evolutionary biologists
Women evolutionary biologists
Living people
Year of birth missing (living people)